The Svea Engineer Corps, designation Ing 1, was a Swedish Army engineer unit that traced its origins back to the 19th century. It was disbanded in 1997. The unit was garrisoned in Uppland and Södermanland.

History 
The unit has its origins in Sapper Company raised in 1855. The company was reorganised to a battalion-sized unit in 1864 and was renamed Sapper Corps. This unit was transformed to a pontoon bridge battalion, Pontoon Battalion, in 1867. The battalion then changed its name once again in 1893 to Svea Engineer Battalion, and in 1902 to Svea Engineer Corps, when it gained the designation Ing 1 (1st Engineer Regiment). That same year, the field telegraphy company that had been attached to the unit became independent and later formed Uppland Regiment.

Svea Engineer Corps was upgraded to a regiment in 1957 and was renamed Svea Engineer Regiment. It was then downgraded to a battalion unit again in 1994, just three years before the unit was disbanded, in 1997. The regiment was garrisoned in Stockholm, Solna and Södertälje during its lifetime.

Organisation 
?

Heraldry and traditions

Coat of arms
The coat of the arms of the Svea Engineer Regiment (Ing 1) 1977–1994 and the Svea Engineer Corps (Ing 1) 1994–1997. Blazon: "Azure, the lesser coat of arms of Sweden, three open crowns placed two and one The shield surmounted a cluster of rays coming down from a mullet, or".

Colours, standards and guidons
It was carried from 1 January 1998 by the Norrland Engineer Corps. When the colour was taken out of use, it was not handed over to the Swedish Army Museum but was exhibited at Ing 1's museum on Laxön. The colour couldn't therefore be admitted to the Swedish Army Museum collection until 2012.

Medals
In 1997,  ("Svea Engineer Corps (Ing 1) Commemorative Medal") i silver (SveaingSMM) of the 8th size was established. The medal is oval and the medal ribbon is divided in black, yellow and black moiré.

Commanding officers

Regimental commanders and battalion and corps commanders between 1900 and 1997.

1900–1904: Nils Gustaf Stedt (also commander of the Field Telegraph Corps (Ing 3).
1904–1910: Georg Juhlin-Dannfelt
1910–1915: August Fredrik Thorssell
1915–1915: Hjalmar Ertman Smitt
1915–1920: Erik Conrad Eriksson
1920–1924: Karl Amundson
1924–1926: Sven Erik Bjurgren
1926–1931: Gustaf Julius Rabe
1931–1934: Sven Alin
1934–1941: Sven Eberhard Tydén
1941–1941: Gunnar Edward Ström
1941–1948: Anders Walther Graûmann
1948–1953: Wilhelm Gottlieb Dahlgren
1953–1959: Axel Welin
1959–1965: Nils Christian Rabe
1965–1969: Åke Bernström
1969–1975: Kåre Svanfeldt
1975–1981: Anders Jonsson
1981–1982: Bengt Gustafsson
1982–1984: Sven-Erik Nilsson
1984–1989: Lars-Åke Persson
1989–1989: Carl Göran Gerhard De Geer
1989–1990: Björn Falkenström (acting)
1990–1994: Björn Falkenström
1994–1997: Christer Wulff

Names, designations and locations

See also
List of Swedish engineer regiments

Footnotes

References

Notes

Print

Further reading

Engineer corps of the Swedish Army
Military units and formations established in 1855
Military units and formations disestablished in 1997
Disbanded units and formations of Sweden
1855 establishments in Sweden
1997 disestablishments in Sweden
Stockholm Garrison